BB&T Ballpark may refer to:

 Muncy Bank Ballpark at Historic Bowman Field, a baseball park in Williamsport, Pennsylvania formerly named BB&T Ballpark at Historic Bowman Field
 Truist Field, a baseball park in Charlotte, North Carolina formerly named BB&T Ballpark
 Truist Stadium, a baseball park in Winston-Salem, North Carolina formerly named BB&T Ballpark

See also
 BB&T Center (Sunrise, Florida)
 TicketReturn.com Field (formerly BB&T Coastal Field)
 Truist Field at Wake Forest (formerly BB&T Field)
 Truist Point (formerly BB&T Point)